Lampranthus roseus, the rosy dewplant, is an evergreen species of flowering succulent plant in the family Aizoaceae. 

The shoots are green grey. The daisy type flowers have yellow centres and petals that vary between pink and purple depending on the season.

References

External links 

roseus